Joe Rogan Questions Everything was an American television series that premiered on SyFy in 2013. The series followed entertainer and stand-up comedian Joe Rogan, as well as co-host Duncan Trussell, as they investigated claims about paranormal and mysterious subjects like Bigfoot, psychic ability and UFOs. It was described as a "comedy/reality/debunking series" as well as a "visual podcast show", and was similar in content to Rogan's podcast: "if you've ever listened to Rogan's podcast, The Joe Rogan Experience, you know the kind of stuff this show will be focusing on".  The show's form was based on a presentation of the topic following up with interviews with experts and members of the public that claimed anecdotal evidence for the cases. Various field research trips awere also done in an attempt to gather evidence. Through the series, Joe Rogan took the position of a skeptic, with the Mansfield News-Journal saying that he "brings a helpful blend — sometimes skeptical, often hopeful and open-minded". The show was loosely based on conversations and topics from the Joe Rogan Experience, with some video out-takes. Some topic presentations and general discussions were set in a podcast studio. Joe Rogan Questions Everything was produced by A. Smith & Co.Productions.

The show was cancelled after one six-episode season.

Reception
Joe Rogan Questions Everything was SyFy's most watched reality premiere in more than five months, averaging 1.3 million total viewers.

Guests and appearances
In the episode "RoboSapien" Joe Rogan interviews Ray Kurzweil with comedian Duncan Trussell appearing as a co-host.

Episodes

References

Syfy original programming
2013 American television series debuts
Paranormal reality television series
2013 American television series endings